Munditiella ammonoceras is a species of sea snail, a marine gastropod mollusk in the family Skeneidae,.

Description
The size of the shell varies between 2 mm and 2.5 mm.

Distribution
This species occurs in the Pacific Ocean off Korea, Japan, Taiwan and the Philippines.

References

 Higo, S., Callomon, P. & Goto, Y. (1999) Catalogue and Bibliography of the Marine Shell-Bearing Mollusca of Japan. Elle Scientific Publications, Yao, Japan, 749 pp.

External links
 To GenBank (5 nucleotides; 3 proteins)
 To World Register of Marine Species
 

ammonoceras
Gastropods described in 1863